Lowell Murray,  (born 26 September 1936) is a former Canadian senator and long-time activist with the federal Progressive Conservative Party.

Education
Murray graduated from St. Francis Xavier University in 1955. He met 16-year-old Brian Mulroney there; the two became close friends and associates in the PC Party.  He later earned an MPA from Queen's University.

In 1961, he became an assistant to federal justice minister Davie Fulton. Later, he served as chief of staff to Progressive Conservative leader Robert Stanfield and then was New Brunswick premier Richard Hatfield's senior advisor.

Appointment to the Senate
Murray was appointed to the Senate on the recommendation of Prime Minister Joe Clark in 1979. In 1986, Prime Minister Mulroney appointed Murray to the Cabinet as Leader of the Government in the Senate, and variously as Minister of State for Federal-Provincial Relations (until 21 April 1991), Minister responsible for the Atlantic Canada Opportunities Agency (June 1987 to September 1988), and Acting Minister of Communications (December 1988 to 30 January 1989). Murray served as Government Leader in the Senate until the defeat of the government of Prime Minister Kim Campbell in 1993.

In 2003, Murray joined with Clark to oppose the merger of the Progressive Conservative Party with the Canadian Alliance to form the Conservative Party of Canada. When the new party was created, he refused to join the new Conservative caucus, and, until his retirement remained one of two senators (the other being Elaine McCoy) to sit as "Progressive Conservatives" even though the federal Progressive Conservative Party had been formally dissolved.

Murray was the last senator appointed on the advice of Prime Minister Clark to sit in the Senate. He was the longest-serving member of the body upon his mandatory retirement from the Senate on 26 September 2011, when he attained the age of 75.

Archives 
There is a Lowell Murray fonds at Library and Archives Canada.

See also
 List of Ontario senators

References

External links
 

1936 births
Canadian senators from Ontario
Progressive Conservative Party of Canada senators
Canadian people of Scottish descent
Living people
Members of the 24th Canadian Ministry
Members of the 25th Canadian Ministry
Members of the King's Privy Council for Canada
People from New Waterford, Nova Scotia
St. Francis Xavier University alumni
Queen's University at Kingston alumni
21st-century Canadian politicians